The Tucano Sustainable Yield State Forest is a state forest in the state of Rondônia, Brazil.

Location

The Tucano Sustainable Yield State Forest is in the municipality of Cujubim, Rondônia.
It adjoins the larger Mutum State Forest to the east.
The soils are mostly red-yellow latosols.
The forest has a resident population.

History

The forest was originally one of the "blocks" of the 1984 Cujubim settlement project.
A management plan for the project's reserves was defined in 1996 in cooperation with the Plan Agropecuario y Forestal de Rondônia (Planafloro: Rondônia Agriculture and Forestry Plan).

The Secretaria de Estado do Desenvolvimento Ambiental (SEDAM) was given administrative responsibility.
The purpose was to provide a space for sustained production of renewable forest resources with natural regeneration, to ensure productive capacity of the forest with minimal alteration of ecosystems.
The forest is part of the Southern Amazon Mosaic, recognized in 2011.

Notes

Sources

State forests of Brazil
Protected areas of Rondônia